Danou is a town in Burkina Faso.

Danou may also refer to:

Places
 , river in the Central African Republic
 Danou, Mali, a commune

People
 Chris Danou (born 1967), former Wisconsin legislator
  (born 1964), Greek filmmaker
 Maria Danou (born 1990), Greek skier

See also
 Danao (disambiguation)
 Danau (disambiguation)
 Dano (disambiguation)
 Danu (disambiguation)